Margaret Mae Roach (March 15, 1921 – November 22, 1964) was an American actress active in the 1930s and 1940s.

She was born on March 15, 1921, in Los Angeles, California, the daughter of Hal Roach and Marguerite Nichols, and her brother was Hal Roach Jr.

Roach was married to the actor Robert Livingston, from 1947 to 1951, and they had one son, actor and writer Addison Randall (born 1949).

Roach died November 1964 from cirrhosis of the liver caused by chronic alcoholism.

Filmography
All Women Have Secrets (1939), as Betty
Fast and Furious (1939), as Emmy Lou
Riders from Nowhere (1940) as Marian Adams
Turnabout (1940)  as Dixie Gale
Niagara Falls (1941) as Honeymooner
Road Show (1941)
A-Haunting We Will Go (1942)
Test Tube Babies (1948)

References

External Links
 

1921 births
1964 deaths
American film actresses
Deaths from cirrhosis